Bedni Bugyal is a Himalayan Alpine meadow and a hill station, situated at an elevation of  in the Chamoli district of Uttarakhand state of India. Bedni Bugyal falls on the way to Roopkund near Wan village. Trisul and Nanda Ghunti are clearly visible from here. This lush green meadow is adorned with blooms in a wide range of varieties. There is a small lake named Vaitarani (Bedni Kund) situated amidst the meadow. The rich flora of the area includes  'Brahm Kamal' or Saussurea obvallata.

References 

Geography of Chamoli district
Hiking trails in Uttarakhand